"Together We Are Beautiful" is a popular song by Fern Kinney. Written by Ken Leray and produced by Carson Whitsett, Wolf Stephenson and Tommy Couch, "Together We Are Beautiful" was originally recorded by Ken Leray in 1977, while a 1979 version by Steve Allan peaked at number 67 in the UK Singles Chart. Kinney's version was originally a B-side to "Baby, Let Me Kiss You", but the song was flipped after DJs picked up on it. The song made number one on the UK Singles Chart for one week in March 1980.

Charts

Weekly charts

Year-end charts

Use in other media
The song was used in a 1999 UK TV advert for the body spray Physio Sport.

The song was played in an episode of the BBC comedy show Gimme Gimme Gimme when the character Linda gets ready for bed before she is due to meet a secret admirer. In 2003, the song was sung by the main character, Ken, carrying out bar/landlord duties, in the opening episode of the first season of the BBC2 sitcom, Early Doors.

The song was also in a 2013 EDF Energy advert, featuring the popular Keepon Zingy, introduced in 2012.

Other cover versions
 Brotherhood of Man covered the song on their album Brotherhood of Man Sing 20 Number One Hits, released in November 1980.
 Chiwetel Ejiofor performed a version of this song for the film Kinky Boots.
 Martine McCutcheon covered the song on her album Wishing.

References

1977 songs
1980 singles
UK Singles Chart number-one singles
Warner Music Group singles